Tetricus may refer to:
 Tetricus I, emperor of the Gallic Empire (Imperium Galliarum) was the last of the Gallic Emperors as Tetricus I from 270/271 to 273.
 his son, Tetricus II, was his co-ruler